Kirkstall, located in southwest Victoria, Australia, 5 kilometres from Koroit, is in the heart of the traditional lands of the local Aboriginal people; the Gunditjmara. On Monday 25 February 1861, Kirkstall was officially proclaimed a township by the then Governor of the Colony of Victoria, Sir Henry Barkly. On 25 February 2011, the town celebrated its 150th anniversary.

Kirkstall's public school shut down in 1994. Kirkstall currently has a small playground, a pub, a hall and a bus stop where people can get out of the town.

References

Towns in Victoria (Australia)
1861 establishments in Australia